Abdelsalem Ben Miloud Salem (1 January 1921 – unknown) was a Moroccan professional footballer who played as a defender. He spent the majority of his career at Marseille.

Honours 
Marseille

 Division 1: 1947–48
 Coupe de France runner-up: 1953–54

References 

1921 births
Year of death missing
People from El Jadida
Moroccan footballers
French footballers
Association football defenders
French sportspeople of Moroccan descent
Wydad AC players
Olympique de Marseille players
SA Thiers players
Ligue 1 players